Per Frantzen (17 July 1920 – 10 October 2005) was a Norwegian footballer. He played in one match for the Norway national football team in 1946.

References

External links
 
 

1920 births
2005 deaths
Norwegian footballers
Norway international footballers
Footballers from Bergen
Association football midfielders